Ralf Briese (2 March 1971, in Leer – 9 October 2011, in Oldenburg) was a German politician for the Alliance '90/The Greens.

He was elected to the Lower Saxon Landtag in 2003, and was re-elected on one occasion 2008. Briese was found dead at his home on October 9, 2011 and police concluded that he committed suicide.
He was suffering from depression. He was succeeded by Meta Janssen-Kucz.

References

1971 births
2011 deaths
Suicides in Germany
Alliance 90/The Greens politicians
Members of the Landtag of Lower Saxony